Tony Plourde (born 25 February 1966) is a Canadian fencer. He competed in the sabre events at the 1988, 1992 and 1996 Summer Olympics.

References

External links
 

1966 births
Canadian male fencers
Fencers at the 1988 Summer Olympics
Fencers at the 1992 Summer Olympics
Fencers at the 1996 Summer Olympics
Living people
Olympic fencers of Canada
People from Chibougamau
Sportspeople from Quebec
Pan American Games medalists in fencing
Pan American Games bronze medalists for Canada
Fencers at the 1995 Pan American Games
Medalists at the 1995 Pan American Games